Kung Chau is an uninhabited island of Hong Kong, located east of Grass Island.

References

Islands of Hong Kong
Tai Po District
Uninhabited islands of Hong Kong